Hammerschlag is a surname. Notable people with the surname include:

Alice Berger Hammerschlag (1917–1969), Austrian artist
Frank Hammerschlag (born 1960), German footballer
Peter Hammerschlag (1902–1942), Austrian writer and poet

See also
Hamerschlag